Jovan Lazarević (born 3 May 1952) is a retired shot putter who represented SFR Yugoslavia.

He won the bronze medal at the 1982 European Indoor Championships, the gold medal at the 1983 Mediterranean Games and the silver medal at the 1987 Mediterranean Games. and finished sixth at the 1984 European Indoor Championships. He became Balkan champion in 1981. He became Yugoslav shot put champion in 1982, 1983, 1987 and 1988.

His personal best throw was 20.54 metres, achieved in July 1990 in Minsk. His former coach was Nikola Tomasović.

References

1952 births
Living people
Serbian male shot putters
Yugoslav male shot putters
Mediterranean Games gold medalists for Yugoslavia
Mediterranean Games silver medalists for Yugoslavia
Athletes (track and field) at the 1983 Mediterranean Games
Athletes (track and field) at the 1987 Mediterranean Games
Mediterranean Games medalists in athletics
Serbs of Bosnia and Herzegovina
People from Travnik